Alejandro Guzmán (born 8 December 1945) is a Mexican former basketball player who competed in the 1968 Summer Olympics. He was born in Durango City.

References

1945 births
Living people
Mexican men's basketball players
1967 FIBA World Championship players
Olympic basketball players of Mexico
Basketball players at the 1968 Summer Olympics
Basketball players at the 1967 Pan American Games
Pan American Games medalists in basketball
Pan American Games silver medalists for Mexico
People from Durango City
Basketball players from Durango
Medalists at the 1967 Pan American Games